The following is a list of notable cannabis companies:

 Acreage Holdings
 Aphria
 Aurora Cannabis
 Arcadia Biosciences
 The Bulldog
 Cannabis City
 Cannabis Corner
 Cannabis Culture
 CanniMed
 Canopy Growth
 Checkpoint coffeeshop
 Colorado Badged Network
 Cresco Labs
 Diego Pellicer
 DrugWarRant
 Eaze
 Goodship
 The Green Organic Dutchman
 GW Pharmaceuticals
 Harborside Health Center
 Have a Heart Compassion Care
 Hawthorne Gardening Company
 Heaven's Stairway
 The Hempest
 Herb
 High Times
 Hiku Brands
 Indiva
 iGrow
 Kush Gods
 Leafbuyer
 Leafly
 Leafs By Snoop
 Lowell Herb Co
 Marley Natural
 MedMen
 Mellow Yellow coffeeshop
 Mirth Provisions
 Openvape
 Planet 13 Holdings
 Prairie Plant Systems
 Privateer Holdings
 Sensi Seeds
 Sisters of the Valley
 SpeedWeed
 Steep Hill Lab
 Tikun Olam (cannabis)
 Tilray
 Tokyo Smoke
 Uncle Ike's Pot Shop
 VIVO Cannabis
 Weed World Candies
 Weedmaps
 WeGrow Store
 Wikileaf
 Willie's Reserve
 World Famous Cannabis Cafe
 Zenabis

See also

 Cannabis dispensaries in the United States
 Cannabis shop
 Coffeeshop (Netherlands)
 List of addiction and substance abuse organizations
 List of cannabis rights organizations
 List of cannabis seed companies
 List of licensed producers of medical marijuana in Canada

Cannabis companies
Cannabis-related lists
Lists of companies